The discography of American singer Victoria Justice consists of one soundtrack album, three extended plays, 10 singles (including six as a featured artist), eight promotional singles, three charity singles, and 19 music videos.

Soundtrack albums

Extended plays

Singles

As lead artist

As featured artist

Promotional singles

Charity singles

Other charted songs

Music videos

See also
List of songs recorded by Victoria Justice

Notes

References

Discography
Justice, Victoria
Justice, Victoria